342 is the second studio album by French avant-garde metal band Pin-Up Went Down, released on 28 June 2010 through Ascendance Records. It is the first album of the band which counted with the participation of Alexis Damien's brother, Nicolas Damien.

The title of the track "Vaginaal Nathrakh" is a pun on the name of British extreme metal band Anaal Nathrakh, while "Murphy in the Sky with Dæmons" may be a possible allusion to The Beatles' song "Lucy in the Sky with Diamonds". Judging by the song's lyrics, the "Murphy" mentioned in the song's title is Edward A. Murphy, famous for popularizing the concept of "Murphy's law".

Track listing

Critical reception
As with their previous album, 2 Unlimited, 342 was also critically acclaimed; Mind over Metal gave it a 4.5 out of 5, comparing the band's sonority and aesthetics favourably to Alexis Damien's former project, Carnival in Coal. Writing for Teeth of the Divine, Mikko K. gave the album a favourable review, also comparing Pin-Up Went Down to Carnival in Coal and to The 3rd and the Mortal as well. Heavy Blog Is Heavy also gave 342 4.5 out of 5 stars, stating: "Pin-Up Went Down have every capability of being a present-day Mr. Bungle; if their name was put out there more, that could very well happen. For fans of experimental, progressive and avant-garde music, Pin-Up Went Down's 342 is a must-listen".

Personnel
 Aurélie Raidron (Asphodel) – vocals, photography, cover art
 Alexis Damien – vocals, guitars, bass, keyboards, piano, drums, production, mixing, mastering
 Nicolas Damien – guitars, keyboards
 Romain Greffe – keyboards (on track 1)
 Benoît Bugeia – keyboards (on track 4)

References

External links
 Pin-Up Went Down's official website

2010 albums
Pin-Up Went Down albums